The House of Olelkovich was a 15th–16th-century princely family from the Grand Duchy of Lithuania. Their main possession was the Duchy of Slutsk–Kapyl. They are sometimes known as Slutskys. They were descended from the Lithuanian Gediminids (male line) and Ruthenian Rurikids (female line). According to the 1528 military census, the family was the fourth wealthiest magnate family in the Grand Duchy. However, its influence declined after the Union of Lublin (1569). The last member of the family was Sophia Olelkovich Radziwill (1585–1612), wife of Janusz Radziwiłł. She was elevated to sainthood in the Eastern Orthodox Church in 1983. As part of her marriage negotiations, she insisted on remaining a member of the Eastern Orthodox Church, despite her future husband's allegiance to Calvinism. She died in childbirth, as did the child. After her death, her considerable wealth and the Duchy of Slutsk passed to the Radziwiłł family.

Family history
Olelko Volodymyrovych (died 1455) was the ancestor of the family. He was a son of Vladimir, Duke of Kiev, and grandson of Algirdas, Grand Duke of Lithuania. Alexander inherited his father's domains in the Duchy of Slutsk–Kapyl and in 1440 restored the family's dynastic interest in the Principality of Kiev, which was confiscated from Vladimir in 1395 after a power struggle with Grand Duke Vytautas and given to Skirgaila. Alexander married Anastasia, daughter of Sophia of Lithuania and Vasily I of Moscow, and had two sons Semen (died 1503) and Mikhailo Olelkovich (died 1481).

Semen married Maria, a daughter of Jonas Goštautas. In the mid-1450s Goštautas planned to depose Grand Duke Casimir IV Jagiellon and to install his son-in-law Semen Olelkovich. Semen inherited the Principality of Kiev, but after his death it was converted into the Kiev Voivodeship. His descendants continued to claim the rights to the region, but the voivodeship was ruled by appointed officials (voivodes) from other noble families. The loss of Kiev could be attributed to Olelkovich's faith (Eastern Orthodoxy rather than Catholicism) and their close kinship with the Grand Princes of Moscow, who threatened Lithuania's eastern borders. However, the Duchy of Slutsk–Kapyl was not converted into a powiat and remained in the family's hands. Disappointed by prevailing politics, Mikhailo Olelkovich organized opposition to Casimir IV and even attempted a coup in 1481. The plot was uncovered, possibly by the voivode of Kiev Ivan Chodkiewicz, and Mikhailo was executed. In 1471, Mikhailo had also been involved in a brief alliance when Novgorod Republic invited him to become its ruler in a bid to break away from Moscow's influence. However, the attempt ended in a decisive defeat at the Battle of Shelon.

After Mikhailo's death, the Olelkovichs did not occupy any state offices. They submitted bids for the throne of the Grand Duke in 1492 and 1572, but gained little support. Semen II moved his court from Kapyl to Slutsk thus establishing the so-called Slutsk line. His descendants are often known as Slutsky. During the Muscovite–Lithuanian Wars, Semen also won a battle near Babruysk September 1502 against the Crimean Khanate. Yuri I also had possessions in Veisiejai, where he funded the building of a Catholic church, and Liškiava.

Family tree

References

External links
 Olelkovych at the Encyclopedia of Ukraine

Gediminids
Lithuanian noble families
Ruthenian noble families